The Skeleton in Armor is the name given to a skeleton associated with metal, bark and cloth artifacts which was unearthed in Fall River, Massachusetts in 1832. The skeleton was subsequently destroyed in a fire in 1843. It is also the name of a poem by Henry Wadsworth Longfellow.

Discovery and description
A contemporary account of the skeleton's discovery and general appearance was written by a Dr. Phineas W. Leland in 1843, soon after the artifact's destruction.  The text of the description was as follows:

Among the curiosities of peculiar interest (in the cabinets of the Fall River Athenaeum) was the entire skeleton of a man, about which antiquarians in the old as well as the new world had speculated much. The skeleton was found in the year 1832 in a sand- or grave-bank a little east of the Unitarian meetinghouse by some persons while digging away and removing a portion of the bank. (On or very near the site now occupied by the "Gas-Works", corner of Hartwell and Fifth Streets). The skeleton was found near the surface in a sitting posture, the legbones doubled upon the thigh-bones, and the thighs brought up nearly parallel with the body. It was quite perfect, and stood remarkably well the test of exposure. Covering the sternum was a triangular plate of brass somewhat corroded by time, and around the body was a broad belt made of small brass tubes four or five inches in length about the size of a pipestem placed parallel and close to each other. Arrowheads made of copper or brass were also found in the grave with the skeleton. That these were the remains of an Indian seemed to be very generally conceded; the configuration of the skull, the position in which the skeleton was found, and the additional fact that parts of other skeletons were found near the same place renders it nearly certain that these were the bones of an Indian.

Another description of the artifact written by John Stark, a lawyer in Galena, Illinois appeared in the 1837 volume of the American Magazine of Useful and Entertaining Knowledge:

These remains were found in the town of Fall River, in Bristol County, Mass., about eighteen months since. In digging down a hill near the village, a large mass of earth slid off, leaving in the bank and partially uncovered a human skull, which, on examination, was found to belong to a body buried in a sitting posture, the head being about one foot below what had been for many years the surface of the ground. The surrounding earth was carefully removed and the body found to be enwrapped in a covering of coarse bark of a dark color. Within this envelope were found the remains of another of coarse cloth, made of fine bark and about the texture of a Manilla coffee-bag. On the breast was a plate of brass, thirteen inches long, six broad at the upper end and five at the lower. This plate appears to have been cast, and is from one-eighth to three thirty-seconds of an inch in thickness. It is so much corroded that whether or not anything was ever engraved upon it has not yet been ascertained. It is oval in form, the edges being irregular, apparently made so by corrosion.

Below the breastplate, and entirely encircling the body, was a belt composed of brass tubes,each four and a half inches in length and three-sixteenths of an inch in diameter, arranged longitudinally and close together, the length of the tube being the width of the belt. The tubes are of thin brass, cast upon hollow reeds, and were fastened together by pieces of sinew. This belt was so placed as to protect the lower parts of the body below the breastplate. The arrows are of brass, thin, flat, and triangular in shape, with a round hole cut through near the base. The shaft was fastened to the head by inserting the latter in an opening at the end of the wood, and then tying it with a sinew through the round hole, a mode of constructing the weapon never practiced by the Indians, not even with their arrows of thin shell. Parts of the shaft still remain attached to some of them. When first discovered the arrows were in a sort of quiver of bark, which fell in pieces when exposed to the air.

The skull is much decayed, but the teeth are sound and apparently of a young man. The pelvis is much decayed and the smaller bones of the lower extremities are gone.

The integuments of the right knee, for four or five inches above and below, are in good preservation, apparently the size and shape of life, although quite black.

Considerable flesh is still preserved on the hands and arms, but more on the shoulders and elbows. On the back under the belt, and for two inches above and below, the skin and flesh are in good preservation, and have the appearance of being tanned. The chest is much compressed, but the upper viscera are probably entire. The arms are bent up, not crossed, so that the hands turned inwards touch the shoulders. The stature is about five and a half feet. Much of the exterior envelope was decayed, and the inner one appeared to be preserved only where it had been in contact with the brass.

The preservation of this body may be the result of some embalming process, and this hypothesis is strengthened by the fact that the skin has the appearance of having been tanned, or it may be the accidental result of the action of the salts of the brass I during oxidation, and this latter hypothesis is supported by the fact that the skin and flesh have been preserved only where they have been in contact with or quite near the brass, or we may account for the preservation of the whole by supposing the presence of salt peter in the soil at the time of the deposit. In either way, the preservation of the remains is fully accounted for, and upon known chemical principles.

That the body was not one of the Indians we think needs no argument. We have seen some of the drawings taken from the sculptures found at Palenque, and in those the figures are represented with the breastplates, although smaller than the plate found at Fall River. On the figures at Palenque the bracelets and anklets seem to be of a manufacture precisely similar to the belt of tubes just described.

If the body found at Fall River be one of the Asiatic race, who transiently settled in Central America, and afterwards went to Mexico and founded those cities, in exploring the ruins of which such astonishing discoveries have recently been made, then we may well suppose also that it is one of the race whose exploits have, although without a date and almost without a certain name, been immortalized by Homer. Of the great race who founded cities and empires in their eastward march, and are finally lost in South America, the Romans seem to have had a glimmering tradition in the story of Evander.

But we rather incline to the belief that the remains found at Fall River belonged to the crew of a Phoenician vessel. The spot where they were found is on the sea-coast, and in the immediate neighborhood of Dighton Rock, famed for its hieroglyphic inscriptions, of which no sufficient explanation has yet been given, alla near which rock brazen vessels have been found. If this latter hypothesis be adopted, a part of it is that these mariners, the unwilling and unfortunate discoverers of a new world, lived some time after they landed, and having written their names, perhaps their epitaphs, upon the rock at Dighton, died, and were buried by the natives.

Loss
The skeleton was moved to the Fall River Athenaeum, a library, where it was displayed in a glass-covered case, along with the arrow tips. The Athenaeum, along with much of the village of Fall River, was destroyed in the "Great Fire" of July 2, 1843.

Identity

Native American
As stated in the Leland article cited above, the majority opinion of the find at the time was that it represented a Native American chief. Given Fall River's location, this could have been a member of the Narragansett or Wampanoag tribe.

Besides the other brass arrowheads mentioned above, at least one identical breastplate has been found, and it is known that traders sold the Indians brass kettles from which they made arrowheads. Arrowheads described as "precisely similar" were used by the Iroquois in the 17th century.

Phoenician, Carthaginian, or Egyptian
As the Stark article reproduced above indicates, there was at least one commentator who suggested a much different origin for the artifact.  The idea that Phoenicians, Carthaginians, or Egyptians had at some time in the past discovered North America and explored or colonized it was somewhat popular at the time of the find, and occasionally used to explain feats such as the construction of Chichen Itza which many contemporary antiquarians could not believe were actually constructed by Mesoamerican civilizations.  This notion has fallen into disfavor and is usually classed as pseudohistory, though there is a small minority of authors who continue to advance such beliefs. 

Phoenicians and later Carthaginians routinely navigated the coasts of the northeastern Atlantic and presumably their trading vessels, blown off course in a storm, could have reached North America. Such accidental one-way contact, as intimated in the last paragraph of Stark's report, could account for the presence of bronze artefacts as well as being compatible with the lack of evidence for a regular settlement, and the absence of indications in Native American oral history (as such shipwrecks would be few in number and just a local curiosity, soon to be forgotten). 

But regardless the theoretical possibility of isolated Atlantic crossings in antiquity, the reported state of preservation of the body - interred in moist soil - essentially rules out an age of more than a few centuries. Even mummified corpses would rapidly decompose under such conditions.

Early colonist or explorer
Because the artifact has been destroyed, there is no way of scientifically dating the remains.  Although the style of armor described as being found with the skeleton certainly does not sound similar to anything worn by early European colonists who settled the area, the possibility that the skeleton belonged to some early settler cannot be entirely discounted.

Fraud
Finally, there is the possibility that the artifact was a deliberate forgery or a practical joke, although there is no clear motive as to why someone would create such a forgery at that time.

Longfellow's poem

Henry Wadsworth Longfellow was evidently familiar with the artifact's discovery.  Unlike the authors of the articles reproduced above, Longfellow apparently considered that the artifact was Norse in origin; Longfellow was familiar with the writings of Carl Christian Rafn on the subject of Norse colonization of the Americas.  Whether or not Longfellow concluded that this was a genuine Norse artifact is unknown.  Nevertheless, he did immortalize the discovery in the poem "The Skeleton in Armor". The poem was first published in Lewis Gaylord Clark's The Knickerbocker in 1841. In the poem, Longfellow also refers to the Old Stone Mill in Touro Park in Newport, Rhode Island, also known as the Newport Tower. Some suggest that the stone structure dates back to the Viking exploration of North America, though it is more likely it was built in the seventeenth century during the time of Governor Benedict Arnold.

Commemoration

In 1903, Fall River placed a bronze tablet on a brick building on Hartwell and Fifth Street to commemorate the finding of the skeleton at that location.

The tablet was 24x20 inches and read: "A Skeleton In Armor was found near this spot by Hannah Borden Cook In the month of May A D 1831 This Tablet was placed here by the Women's Educational and Industrial Society of Fall River Mass May 27th A D 1903".

The tablet was stolen in 2018 by metal thieves but was recovered and repositioned in a more secure spot.

References

External links
The Skeleton in Armor (the articles cited in the 'Discovery and Description section' can be found here
Longfellow's poem The Skeleton in Armor reproduced here

Pre-statehood history of Massachusetts
Pre-Columbian trans-oceanic contact
Fall River, Massachusetts